Alfred George Buist (1883 – after 1907), known as George Buist, was an English footballer who made 83 appearances in the Football League for Lincoln City playing as a goalkeeper.

References

1883 births
Footballers from Greater London
English footballers
Association football goalkeepers
Willington Athletic F.C. players
Lincoln City F.C. players
North Shields F.C. players
English Football League players
Year of death missing
Place of death missing